Sun Lingfeng (born 14 August 1978 in Beijing, China) is a Chinese baseball player who was a member of Team China at the 2008 Summer Olympics.

Sports career
1998 National Team;
2004 Beijing Municipal Team

Major performances
1997/2001/2005 National Games - 1st/2nd/2nd

References
Profile 2008 Olympics Team China

1978 births
Living people
2006 World Baseball Classic players
Baseball players at the 2008 Summer Olympics
2009 World Baseball Classic players
Chinese baseball players
Olympic baseball players of China
Baseball players from Beijing
Baseball players at the 1998 Asian Games
Baseball players at the 2002 Asian Games
Asian Games competitors for China